Tondo may refer to:

 Tondo (art), a circular painting or sculpture
 Tondo, Manila, a district of Manila
 Tondo (historical polity), an early historic polity on the north side of the Pasig River delta in Luzon, Philippines; a predecessor of the modern-day district
 Tondo Conspiracy, a plot against Spanish colonial rule by Tagalog and Kapampangan noblemen in 1587–1588
 Isaac Tondo (born 1981), Liberian footballer
 Xavier Tondó (1978–2011), Spanish professional road racing cyclist

See also

Tonda (disambiguation)
Tondi (disambiguation)
Tonho (name)
Tonio (name)
Tonko